The Manchukuo Imperial Guards were an elite unit of the Manchukuo armed forces created in 1933. It was charged with the protection of the Kangde Emperor, the imperial household, and senior members of the Manchukuo civil government. Their garrison and headquarters were situated in the capital of Xinjing, adjacent to the Imperial Palace.

History
The Manchukuo Imperial Guards were inspired by the Imperial Guards of the Qing dynasty and patterned after the Imperial Guard of Japan. Its 200 members were selected from candidates of ethnic Manchu backgrounds, and were trained independently of the Manchukuo Imperial Army or the Japanese Kwantung Army. Although largely a ceremonial force, the company received the latest firearms and also carried Japanese-style swords as dress weaponry. Their uniforms were grey or black with silver or gold insignia, with a five-color, five pointed star on their helmets and kepis. 

An independent brigade called the Jing'an Guerilla Unit was formed for use in covert and special operations during the Pacification of Manchukuo. It was effective in combat, having participated in the Ki Feng-lung District Subjugation in November 1932 and in anti-bandit operations. The ceremonial unit was part of the corps.

The Manchukuo Imperial Guards fought their last battles during the Soviet invasion of Manchuria and had ceased to exist at the conclusion of the Soviet–Japanese War.

See also
 Imperial Guards (Qing China)
 Imperial Guard of Japan
 Manchukuo Imperial Army
 Manchukuo Imperial Navy
 Manchukuo Imperial Air Force

References 
 
Protective security units
Former guards regiments
Guards
Royal guards
Military units and formations established in 1933
Military units and formations disestablished in 1945